This is a list of law enforcement agencies in the state of South Dakota.

According to the US Bureau of Justice Statistics' 2008 Census of State and Local Law Enforcement Agencies, the state had 155 law enforcement agencies employing 1,636 sworn police officers, about 203 for each 100,000 residents.

South Dakota State Law Enforcement Agencies 
 South Dakota Division of Criminal Investigation - DCI 
 South Dakota Department of Corrections
 South Dakota Highway Patrol
 South Dakota Game, Fish, & Parks - GFP or Conservation Officers 
 South Dakota Commission on Gaming
 South Dakota Motor Carrier
 South Dakota State Fair Police Department- Huron

Federal Agencies within South Dakota
 Bureau of Alcohol, Tobacco, Firearms and Explosives - ATF
 Bureau of Indian Affairs- BIA
 Drug Enforcement Administration - DEA
 Federal Bureau of Investigation - FBI
 National Park Service - NPS
 United States Marshal Services - USMS

County agencies 

Aurora County Sheriff's Office
Beadle County Sheriff's Office
Bennett County Sheriff's Office
Bon Homme County Sheriff's Office
Brookings County Sheriff's Office
Brown County Sheriff's Office
Brule County Sheriff's Office
Buffalo County Sheriff's Office
Butte County Sheriff's Office
Campbell County Sheriff's Office
Charles Mix County Sheriff's Office

Clark County Sheriff's Office
Clay County Sheriff's Office
Codington County Sheriff's Office
Corson County Sheriff's Office
Custer County Sheriff's Office
Davison County Sheriff's Office
Day County Sheriff's Office
Deuel County Sheriff's Office
Dewey County Sheriff's Office
Douglas County Sheriff's Office
Edmunds County Sheriff's Office

Fall River County Sheriff's Office
Faulk County Sheriff's Office
Grant County Sheriff's Office
Gregory County Sheriff's Office
Haakon County Sheriff's Office
Hamlin County Sheriff's Office
Hand County Sheriff's Office
Hanson County Sheriff's Office
Harding County Sheriff's Office
Hughes County Sheriff's Office
Hutchinson County Sheriff's Office

Hyde County Sheriff's Office
Jackson County Sheriff's Office
Jerauld County Sheriff's Office
Jones County Sheriff's Office
Kingsbury County Sheriff's Office
Lake County Sheriff's Office
Lawrence County Sheriff's Office
Lincoln County Sheriff's Office
Lyman County Sheriff's Office
Marshall County Sheriff's Office
McCook County Sheriff's Office

McPherson County Sheriff's Office
Meade County Sheriff's Office
Mellette County Sheriff's Office
Miner County Sheriff's Office
Minnehaha County Sheriff's Office
Moody County Sheriff's Office
Pennington County Sheriff's Office
Perkins County Sheriff's Office
Potter County Sheriff's Office
Roberts County Sheriff's Office
Sanborn County Sheriff's Office

Oglala County Sheriff's Office -formerly known as Shannon County in 2015
Spink County Sheriff's Office
Stanley County Sheriff's Office
Sully County Sheriff's Office
Todd County Sheriff's Office
Tripp County Sheriff's Office
Turner County Sheriff's Office
Union County Sheriff's Office
Walworth County Sheriff's Office
Yankton County Sheriff's Office
Ziebach County Sheriff's Office

City agencies 

Aberdeen Police Department
Alcester Police Department
Avon Police Department
Belle Fourche Police Department
Beresford Police Department
Box Elder Police Department
Brandon Police Department
Brookings Police Department
Burke Police Department
Canton Police Department
Centerville Police Department
Chamberlain Police Department
Clark Police Department
Deadwood Police Department

Elk Point Police Department
Freeman Police Department
Faith Police Department
Flandreau Police Department
Gettysburg Police Department
Gregory Police Department
Groton Police Department
Hot Springs Police Department
Huron Police Department
Kimball Police Department
Lead Police Department
Lennox Police Department
Madison Police Department
Martin Police Department
Menno Police Department

Milbank Police Department
Miller Police Department
Mission Police Department
Mitchell Police Department
Mobridge Police Department
Murdo Police Department
North Sioux City Police Department
Parkston Police Department
Philip Police Department
Pierre Police Department
Platte Police Department
Rapid City Police Department
Scotland Police Department
Sioux Falls Police Department

Sisseton Police Department
Spearfish Police Department
Springfield Police Department
Sturgis Police Department
 Summerset Police Department
Tea Police Department
Vermillion Police Department
Viborg Police Department
Wagner Police Department
Watertown Police Department
Webster Police Department
White Wood Police Department
Winner Police Department
Yankton Police Department

College and university agencies 
South Dakota School of Mines Police Department
South Dakota State University Police Department
University of South Dakota Police Department

Disbanded agencies 

Burke Police Department
Canistota Police Department
Colman Police Department
Corsica Police Department
Dell Rapids Police Department
Delmont Police Department
Dupree Police Department
Edgemont Police Department
Estelline Police Department
Fort Pierre Police Department

Harrisburg Police Department
Hurley Police Department
Irene Police Department
Jefferson Police Department
Kadoka Police Department
Keystone Police Department
Lake Andes Police Department
Leola Police Department
Lemmon Police Department

Marion Police Department
McLaughlin Police Department
Miller Police Department
Parker Police Department
Rosholt Police Department
Roslyn Police Department
Scotland Police Department
Selby Police Department
Tyndall Police Department
Wall Police Department

Tribal agencies - BIA 

Cheyenne River Police Department
Crow Creek Police Department
Flandreau Santee Sioux Police Department
Lower Brule Police Department

Oglala Lakota Police Department
Rosebud Police Department
Sisseton- Wahpeton Oyate Police Department
Yankton Sioux Police Department

References

South Dakota
Law enforcement agencies
Law enforcement agencies of South Dakota